Diphu Assembly constituency is one of the 126 constituencies of the Assam Legislative Assembly in India. Diphu forms a part of the Autonomous District Lok Sabha constituency. This seat is reserved for the Scheduled Tribes (ST).

Diphu Assembly constituency

Following are details on Diphu Assembly constituency-

 Country: India.
 State: Assam.
 District:  Karbi Anglong district.
 Lok Sabha Constituency: Autonomous District Lok Sabha/Parliamentary constituency..
 Assembly Categorisation: Rural constituency.
 Literacy Level: 89.12%.
 Eligible Electors as per 2021 General Elections: 1,99,983 Eligible Electors. Male Electors: 1,00,237. Female Electors: 99,737.
 Geographic Co-Ordinates: 25°50'27.2"N 93°24'13.0"E..
 Total Area Covered: 3188 square kilometres.
 Area Includes: Diphu thana and Langfer and Duardisa (Part-I) mouzas in Howraghat thana in Dip, of Karbi Anglong district of Assam.
 Inter State Border: Karbi Anglong.
 Number Of Polling Stations: Year 2011-240, Year 2016-245, Year 2021-19.

Members of Legislative Assembly 

Following is the list of past members representing Diphu Assembly constituency in Assam Legislature.
 1978: Gandhi Ram Timung, Janata Party.
 1983: Kaizasong, Independent.
 1985: Samsing Hanse, Independent.
 1991: Dipendra Rongpi, Autonomous State Demand Committee.
 1996: Hemsing Tisso, Autonomous State Demand Committee.
 2001: Bidya Sing Engleng, Indian National Congress.
 2006: Bidya Sing Engleng, Indian National Congress.
 2011: Bidya Sing Engleng, Indian National Congress.
 2016: Sum Ronghang, Bharatiya Janata Party.
 2021: Bidya Sing Engleng, Bharatiya Janata Party.

Election results

2021 result

2016 result

2011 result

See also
 Diphu
 Autonomous District Lok Sabha constituency
 Karbi Anglong district

References

External links 
 

Assembly constituencies of Assam
Karbi Anglong district